Andrei Yegorovich Durnovtsev (14 January 1923 – 24 October 1976) was a pilot of the Soviet Air Force. He dropped the Tsar Bomba on 30 October 1961 at Cape Sukhoi Nos,  from Mityushikha Bay, north of Matochkin Strait. The tests were monitored by a government commission headed by Marshal of the Soviet Union Kirill Moskalenko. He flew a specially modified Tu-95V which utilized special white paint to reflect the enormous amount of heat radiation given off by the Tsar Bomba's fusion reaction; the release plane was accompanied by a Tu-16 observer plane that took air samples and filmed the test.  He was promoted to Lt. Colonel after the mission and named a Hero of the Soviet Union.

References

1923 births
1976 deaths
Soviet Air Force officers
Heroes of the Soviet Union